Newcastle & Hunter Community Rugby League is the governing body of second tier rugby league in the Newcastle and Hunter region. Formed in 2006 after a merger between the Maitland & Coalfields Rugby League and Lower Hunter Rugby League Competitions. It is now the largest senior Rugby League competition in the world. Newcastle & Hunter Rugby League competitions consists of five senior men's divisions, A Grade, B Grade, C Grade, Northern Conference & Southern Conference, as well as two Ladies League Tag divisions and Ladies Tackle. Currently there are over 50 men's teams, as well as 18 Ladies League Tag teams and 8 Ladies Tackle teams.

History
The inaugural season of Newcastle & Hunter Rugby League was 2007 after the amalgamation of the Lower Hunter Rugby League and the Hunter Valley Rugby League. 23 clubs (24 teams) entered 3 grades in the first season.

Current Clubs

Former clubs

Major Grades

Lake Macquarie Forklift Services A Grade Premiers

Women's Tackle Premiers

Ladies League Tag Division One

Minor Grades

B Grade Premiers

C Grade Premiers

D Grade Premiers
The competition was split into Northern & Southern Conferences in 2018 and 2019.

Northern Conference

Southern Conference

Ladies League Tag Division Two

Ladies League Tag C Grade

References

External links

Rugby league competitions in New South Wales